Jaan Se Pyaara is a 1992 Hindi-language action-romantic comedy film directed by Anand. It stars Govinda and Divya Bharti. Aruna Irani, Kiran Kumar, Raza Murad appear in supporting roles. The film was an unofficial remake of Heart of Dragon (1985). The concept of one actor playing the role of both brothers, unlike in the original version, was borrowed from the Kannada movie Shivashankar (1990) which was also based on Heart of Dragon. It was a modest hit.

Synopsis
The film shows police Inspector Jai (Govinda) living a middle-class life with his mother (Aruna Irani) and physically and mentally challenged brother Sundar (also Govinda). One day he arrests Pandey, and after questioning him, finds out that the person behind the crime was Guman Singh (Raza Murad). He arrests Guman. A series of explosions creates havoc in the city. The bombers demand Guman's unconditional release. The police comply. They threaten Jai with dire consequences, forcing Jai to resign from his job. 

Hoping that he and his family are safe, Jai starts to re-build his life, along with his sweetheart, Sharmila (Divya Bharti) who was an orphan. Then his mother is killed in an accident, and his brother is abducted by Jagtap Singh (Kiran Kumar) and Guman, who demand that he return a bag containing their valuables. Jai is willing to do anything to get back his brother. Jhatap Singh and Guman Singh tell Jay that if he doesn't return the box they will kill his brother. Sundar had hidden the bag and children who were playing with him tell Jai where it is. Jai brings the box to Jagtap Singh, but they don't release Sundar. Jai rescues his brother and starts fighting with them. Jagtap Singh says that he had killed Jai's mother. When Sundar hears that, Sundar starts fighting with Jagtap Singh, while Jai fights Gunman Singh. Sundar kills Jagtap Singh and Sundar kills Gunman Singh. Jay takes his brother to hospital where he recovers.

Cast
 Govinda as Inspector Jai and Sundar (dual role)
 Divya Bharti as Sharmila/Jai's love interest 
 Aruna Irani as Jai / Sundar's mother
 Raza Murad as Guman Singh 
 Kiran Kumar as Jagtap Singh 
 Suresh Chatwal as Minister Mishra
 Rajendra Gupta as Supritendent of Police, Ramlal Gupta
Dinesh Hingoo as School Principal 
Irshad Hashmi as Tandon, Press Reporter 
 Piloo Wadia as Mrs. Pestonjee

Track list
The music was given by Anand–Milind. The song "Bin Tere kuch Bhi" was based on the Kannada song "Yendendu Ninnanu Maretu" from Eradu Kanasu.

References

External links 
 

1990s Hindi-language films
1992 films
1992 crime drama films
Films scored by Anand–Milind
Indian remakes of Hong Kong films
Indian crime drama films